The Queensland Women cricket team, also known as the Konica Minolta Queensland Fire, is the women's representative cricket team for the Australian State of Queensland. They play most of their home games at Allan Border Field, Brisbane and they also use South Brisbane District Cricket Club's Fehlberg Oval and Kerrydale Oval, Robina. They compete in the Women's National Cricket League (WNCL), the premier 50-over women's cricket tournament in Australia. They previously played in the now-defunct Australian Women's Twenty20 Cup and Australian Women's Cricket Championships.

History

1931–1996: Australian Women's Cricket Championships
Queensland's first recorded match was a one-day, two-innings affair against New South Wales in the Australian Women's Cricket Championships on 23 March 1931, which they lost by an innings and 51 runs. They continued to play in the Championships until its final season in 1995–96, however, they failed to win the title.

1996–present: Women's National Cricket League and Twenty20 Cup
Queensland joined the newly-established WNCL in 1996–97. They finished as runners-up in 2000–01, 2005–06, 2012–13, 2016–17 and 2018–19, before winning their first title in 2020–21. They have won one Australian Women's Twenty20 Cup, in 2013–14.

Grounds
Queensland have used a number of grounds over the years. Their first recorded home match against New South Wales in 1933 was played at the Exhibition Ground, Brisbane. Historically they have played the vast majority of their home matches at various grounds in Brisbane including intermittent matches at the Gabba, the last of which came in 2016. They have also played occasional matches in Toowoomba and Beenleigh.

Since 2017, Queensland have played most of their home matches at Allan Border Field, Brisbane as well as occasional matches at Fehlberg Park in Brisbane and Kerrydale Oval in Robina. They played their three 2020–21 WNCL home games at Allan Border Field. After playing all their matches in the 2021–22 WNCL away from home, in the 2022–23 WNCL they used Allan Border Field, Kerrydale Oval and, for the first time, Ian Healy Oval.

Players

Current squad
Based on squad announced for the 2022/23 season. Players in bold have international caps.

Notable players
Players who have played for Queensland and played internationally are listed below, in order of first international appearance (given in brackets):

 Kath Smith (1934)
 Joyce Brewer (1935)
 Val Slater (1957)
 Glenda Hall (1984)
  Nicola Payne (1988)
 Katherine Raymont (1990)
 Joanne Broadbent (1990)
 Kim Fazackerley (1992)
 Sharyn Bow (1993)
 Julia Price (1996)
 Jodi Dannatt (1997)
 Megan White (1999)
 Dawn Holden (1999)
 Louise Broadfoot (2000)
 Sally Cooper (2001)
 Melissa Bulow (2003)
 Kirsten Pike (2005)
 Jodie Fields (2006)
 Delissa Kimmince (2008)
 Jess Duffin (2009)
 Jess Jonassen (2012)
 Holly Ferling (2013)
 Felicity Leydon-Davis (2014)
 Grace Harris (2015)
 Beth Mooney (2016)

Coaching staff
 Head coach: Ashley Noffke
 Assistant coach: Scott Prestwidge
 Physiotherapist: Anlo van Deventer

Honours
Australian Women's Cricket Championships:
Winners (0):
Best finish: runners-up (1938–39)
Women's National Cricket League:
Winners (1): 2020–21
Australian Women's Twenty20 Cup:
Winners (1): 2013–14

See also

Queensland Cricket
Queensland men's cricket team
Brisbane Heat (WBBL)

Notes

References

 
Australian women's cricket teams
Cricket in Queensland
Fire
Sporting clubs in Brisbane